Rita McGhee (born August 22, 1964) is an American costume designer for film and television. Her career has included  projects spanning various fashion eras. She is known for her work on season 1 of FOX's musical drama series Empire. In July 2015, McGhee's costume design on episode 8, "The Lyon's Roar", was nominated for the Emmy Award for Outstanding Costumes for a Contemporary Series, Limited Series, or Movie. The following year, in January 2016, her costume design for the season was nominated for the Costume Designers Guild Award for Outstanding Contemporary Costumes for a Television Series.

In addition, McGhee has led and/or contributed costume design for projects such as Spike Lee's musical drama film Chi-Raq (2015), BET's miniseries The New Edition Story (2017), Disney's musical film Zombies (2018), and BET's miniseries American Soul (2019).

Early life and education 
McGhee was born in San Francisco, California to Troy and Claudette McGhee. In 1968, her family relocated to Santa Rita, Guam when her father accepted a civil service position on the island. She has four siblings.

McGhee graduated from George Washington High School in Mangilao, Guam in 1982 and attended Howard University, studying fashion merchandising and business administration. She also took classes in costume design while working in the school theater, and graduated in 1989 with a Bachelor of Science.

Career 
After McGhee heard Spike Lee lecture at her college, she sent her resume to costume designer, Ruth E. Carter who was working with Lee's production company, and was hired by Carter as an intern and wardrobe production assistant. She then moved to Los Angeles, California and worked on Mo' Better Blues (1990), Jungle Fever (1991), The Five Heartbeats (1991), and What's Love Got to Do With It (1993) among others. McGhee also worked in the costume and wardrobe departments for In Living Color (1991-1992), Moesha (1996), and  Baby Boy (2001).

After becoming a costume designer, McGhee worked on Reggie Rock Bythewood's Biker Boyz (2003), Jeffrey W. Byrd's King's Ransom (2005), and Benny Boom's Next Day Air (2009). She then took a break from Hollywood and relocated to Friendswood, Texas.

McGhee later interviewed for the costume designer position for Lee Daniels and Danny Strong's television series Empire. She accepted the job offer and relocated to Chicago, Illinois for filming. In March 2015, her costume design for Empire was referred to as the "hip-hop royalty look" by the Los Angeles Times. In July 2015, her work on the season 1 episode, "The Lyon's Roar", was nominated for an Emmy. The episode featured a "White Party"  scene where the cast dressed in all white clothing.  McGhee and her team launched Cookie's Closet, a website page featuring styles worn by Empire actress, Taraji P. Henson. In September 2015, Saks Fifth Avenue launched a curated fashion collection inspired by the show.

McGhee did not return for season 2 of Empire. She worked on the film Chi-Raq with Ruth E. Carter as lead costume designer. McGhee later provided costume design for The New Edition Story with clothing choices described as a "virtuosic symphony" by The New York Times. She continued to work on  projects including Lifetime's Michael Jackson: Searching for Neverland (2017) and ABC's The Mayor (2017).

McGhee is a member of the Black Design Collective, a non-profit organization for African-American fashion designers and costume designers. She is also a member of the Costume Designers Guild.

Filmography

Television

References

External links 
 
 

1964 births
Living people
American costume designers
20th-century African-American people
21st-century African-American people
Guamanian women
Artists from San Francisco
Howard University alumni
20th-century African-American women
21st-century African-American women